Waldau is a surname. Notable people with the surname include:

Åsa Waldau (born 1965), Swedish religious leader
Harry Waldau (1876–1943), German musician
Max Waldau (1825–1855), German poet and writer
Nikolaj Coster-Waldau (born 1970), Danish actor
Paul Waldau, American academic